The 2007–08 season was Olympique Lyonnais's 49th season in Ligue 1 and their 19th consecutive season in the top division of French football. They were the defending champions having won the title the past six consecutive seasons.

Current squad
As of 8 March 2008.

 (on loan from Barcelona)

Transfers

In

Out

Players out on loan

Club
ManagementKit

|
|
|
|

Other information

Competitions

Ligue 1
After a tough Ligue 1 season marred by injuries to key players, Lyon became champions for the seventh consecutive season holding off Bordeaux. They claimed the title after defeating Auxerre on the final day of the season.

League table

Results summary

Results by round

UEFA Champions League
Lyon made their seventh-straight appearance in the UEFA Champions League. They were pitted in the so-called "group of death", which featured German champions VfB Stuttgart, Spanish giants Barcelona and Scottish giants Rangers. After two disappointing 0–3 losses to Barcelona at the Camp Nou and Rangers at home, Lyon rebounded picking up two important wins in their home-away series against Stuttgart. Following their 2–2 draw at home against Barcelona, Lyon faced a tough challenge as they needed to defeat Rangers at Ibrox in order to advance to the knockout stages. As Rangers only needed a draw, odds were against Lyon. However, after an early goal by Sidney Govou, Lyon ended Rangers hope with two late goals from Karim Benzema sending Lyon to the knockout stages for the fifth consecutive season.

Group E

Results by round

First knockout round
Lyon were paired against English champions Manchester United in the Round of 16. After a 1–1 draw at home, Lyon failed to respond at Old Trafford, losing 0–1 on a Cristiano Ronaldo goal just before half-time.

Coupe de la Ligue
Lyon entered this year's Coupe de la Ligue as the defending runners-up after losing to Bordeaux in the 2007 final. Having made it to the Champions League, Lyon were given their annual bye into the first knockout round, where they defeated Caen 3–1. With that win, they were pitted against Le Mans in the quarter-finals. After an early goal by Le Mans midfielder Daisuke Matsui, Lyon could not break through their sturdy defence as they bowed out of the League Cup for the seventh-straight season, their last cup triumph being in 2001.

Results by round

Coupe de France
Lyon got their Coupe de France season off to a strong start defeating Championnat National side Créteil 4–0, with Karim Benzema picking up a hat-trick. This match was notable as it marked the return of Lyon goalkeeper Grégory Coupet who had been out for four months with a torn medial ligament. Following their Round of 32 success, they were pitted against the surprising, yet upset-minded CFA side Croix de Savoie. After a hard-fought first half, it took an 80th-minute strike from Fred to pull Lyon through to the next round where they faced the defending champions Sochaux. Following an unimpressive first half from both clubs, Benzema opened the scoring for Lyon in the 56th minute. After holding the score at 1–0, Lyon failed to keep a clean sheet as Kandia Traoré equalised for Sochaux near the beginning of injury time. With extra time looming, Benzema again scored for Lyon to give them the victory and the right to move to the quarter-finals, where they faced relegation-bound Metz.

Metz, looking to create something special out of a disappointing league season, played very bravely as they tried to pull off a historic upset. Benzema, however, again scored for Lyon (his 28th of the season and sixth in the Coupe de France) to give them a 1–0 lead in the 39th minute. That would be the eventual scoreline as Lyon advanced to the semifinals where they faced Ligue 2 side Sedan. In one of the more entertaining matches of the cup, with both teams displaying their attacking prowess and both goalkeepers stepping up in times of need, it took one of Juninho's vintage free kicks to finally knock out the tough Ligue 2 side and thus book Lyon's place in the final at the Stade de France, where they faced rivals Paris Saint-Germain. The final was heavily contested and eventually headed into extra time. Lyon finally broke through with a goal from Sidney Govou. Lyon would hold on to that scoreline as they prevailed to capture their fourth Coupe de France title in their history and the first in the Jean-Michel Aulas era. For more information on the final, click below.

Coupe de France Final 2008

Results by round

Statistics
Last updated on 24 May 2008.

|}

References

Lyon
Olympique Lyonnais seasons
French football championship-winning seasons